{{Infobox person
| name               = James Daly
| image              = James Daly Medical Center 1975.jpg
| imagesize          = 
| caption            = Daly in Medical Center, 1975
| birth_name         = James Firman Daly
| birth_date         = 
| birth_place        = Wisconsin Rapids, Wisconsin, U.S.
| death_date         = 
| death_place        = Nyack, New York, U.S.
| othername          = 
| years active       = 1946-1978
| television         = Medical Center, Twelve O'Clock High
| occupation         = Actor
| alma_mater         = Cornell College
| spouse             = 
| website            = 
| awards             = 
| children           = 4, including Tyne and Tim Daly
}}
James Firman Daly (October 23, 1918 – July 3, 1978) was an American theater, film, and television actor, who is perhaps best known for his role as Paul Lochner in the hospital drama series Medical Center, in which he played Chad Everett's superior.

Early life
Daly was born in Wisconsin Rapids in Wood County in central Wisconsin, to Dorothy Ethelbert (Hogan) Mullen, who later worked for the Central Intelligence Agency, and Percifer Charles Daly, a fuel merchant. During the 1930s, Daly studied drama and acted in shows before serving in three branches of the armed forces, including six months as an infantryman in the U.S. Army, two months as a cadet in the Army Air Corps, and more than four years in the Navy as an ensign during World War II.

Daly attended the University of Wisconsin, State University of Iowa, and Carroll College before receiving a degree from Cornell College in Mount Vernon, Iowa. Cornell College later presented him with an honorary Doctor of Fine Arts degree.

Career

Daly was an accomplished stage actor, starting out in 1946 as Gary Merrill's understudy in Born Yesterday. His starring roles on Broadway included Archibald MacLeish's Pulitzer Prize- winning J.B. and Tennessee Williams' Period of Adjustment.

Between 1953 and 1955, Daly appeared in the TV series Foreign Intrigue. He guest-starred on many television series, including Appointment with Adventure (two episodes), Breaking Point, Mission: Impossible ("Shock"), DuPont Cavalcade Theater ("One Day at a Time" 1955) portraying Bill Wilson the co-founder of Alcoholics Anonymous, The Twilight Zone ("A Stop at Willoughby"), The Tenderfoot (1964) for Walt Disney's Wonderful World of Color, The Road West (1966 episode "The Gunfighter"), Custer, Gunsmoke (1968 episode "The Favor"), Combat!, The Fugitive, The Virginian, and Twelve O'Clock High. He portrayed Mr. Flint (an apparently immortal human) in the Star Trek episode "Requiem for Methuselah" (1969). He starred in "Medical Center" on CBS from 1969-1975.

In 1958, Daly signed a contract with the R.J. Reynolds Tobacco Company to do television commercials for Camel cigarettes. He served as the Camel representative for seven years, being flown by Reynolds throughout the United States to be filmed smoking a Camel cigarette at various locations.

In addition to his acting career, Daly was one of the hosts on NBC Radio's weekend Monitor program in 1963–1964.

Daly's last screen role was as Mr. Boyce in the mini-series Roots: The Next Generations.

Personal life
According to his son Tim Daly during an interview on CBS News Sunday Morning, James Daly came out to Tim as gay a decade after divorcing his wife Hope. His struggle to come to terms with his sexual orientation nearly put a rift between him and his family. As homosexuality was still considered a mental illness until the early 1970s, he and his wife tried and failed at "curing" him. After their divorce, Daly decided to limit his contact with his children out of fear that they would end up mentally ill themselves.

Two of Daly's children, Tyne Daly and Tim Daly, and his granddaughter, Kathryne Dora Brown, and grandson, Sam Daly, are actors. Tyne appeared on Daly's TV series, Foreign Intrigue, as a child. She also played Jennifer Lochner, Paul Lochner's adult daughter, on Medical Center in the 1970 season 1 episode Moment of Decision. The elder Daly and his daughter both guest-starred separately in the original Mission: Impossible TV series. Tim appeared as a child with his father in Henrik Ibsen's play, An Enemy of the People. Daly had two other children: daughters Mary Glynn and Pegeen Michael.

Death
Daly died on July 3, 1978, of heart failure in Nyack, New York, two years after Medical Center ended, and while he was preparing to star in the play Equus'' in Tarrytown, New York. His ashes were sprinkled into the Atlantic Ocean.

Filmography

Theatre

Awards

References

External links

1918 births
1978 deaths
20th-century American male actors
20th-century American LGBT people
American gay actors
American male film actors
American male television actors
Carroll University alumni
Cornell College alumni
Iowa State University alumni
LGBT people from Wisconsin
Male actors from Wisconsin
Male Spaghetti Western actors
Military personnel from Wisconsin
Outstanding Performance by a Supporting Actor in a Drama Series Primetime Emmy Award winners
People from Wisconsin Rapids, Wisconsin
United States Army personnel of World War II
United States Army Air Forces personnel of World War II
United States Navy officers
United States Navy personnel of World War II
University of Wisconsin–Madison College of Letters and Science alumni